The 2016 Korea Masters Grand Prix Gold was the 21st Grand Prix badminton tournament of the 2016 BWF Grand Prix Gold and Grand Prix. The tournament was held at Seogwipo Olympic Memorial Civic Center in Seogwipo in South Korea 6 – 11 December 2016 and had a total purse of $120,000.

Men's singles

Seeds

 Son Wan-ho (champion)
 Lee Hyun-il (second round)
 Lee Dong-keun (quarterfinals)
 Wang Tzu-wei (second round)
 Zulfadli Zulkiffli (withdrew)
 Jeon Hyeok-jin (quarterfinals)
 Kanta Tsuneyama (withdrew)
 Pannawit Thongnuam (second round)

Finals

Top half

Section 1

Section 2

Section 3

Section 4

Bottom half

Section 5

Section 6

Section 7

Section 8

Women's singles

Seeds

 Sung Ji-hyun (champion)
 Bae Yeon-ju (first round)
 Yui Hashimoto (second round)
 Ayumi Mine (quarterfinals)
 Aya Ohori (second round)
 Hsu Ya-ching (first round)
 Kim Hyo-min (second round)
 Lee Chia-hsin (quarterfinals)

Finals

Top half

Section 1

Section 2

Bottom half

Section 3

Section 4

Men's doubles

Seeds

 Lee Jhe-huei / Lee Yang (final)
 Kittinupong Kedren / Dechapol Puavaranukroh (second round)
 Danny Bawa Chrisnanta / Hendra Wijaya (first round)
 Takuto Inoue / Yuki Kaneko (first round)
 Huang Kaixiang / Wang Yilu (withdrew)
 Lu Ching-yao / Yang Po-han (semifinals)
 Hiroyuki Saeki / Ryota Taohata (quarterfinals)
 Lin Chia-yu / Wang Chi-lin (quarterfinals)

Finals

Top half

Section 1

Section 2

Bottom half

Section 3

Section 4

Women's doubles

Seeds

 Jung Kyung-eun / Shin Seung-chan (champion)
 Chang Ye-na / Lee So-hee (quarterfinals)
 Puttita Supajirakul / Sapsiree Taerattanachai (first round)
 Yuki Fukushima / Sayaka Hirota (first round)
 Bao Yixin / Yu Xiaohan (withdrew)
 Chae Yoo-jung / Kim So-yeong (final)
 Kim Hye-rin / Yoo Hae-won (semifinals)
 Mayu Matsumoto / Wakana Nagahara (quarterfinals)

Finals

Top half

Section 1

Section 2

Bottom half

Section 3

Section 4

Mixed doubles

Seeds

 Ko Sung-hyun / Kim Ha-na (champion)
 Dechapol Puavaranukroh / Sapsiree Taerattanachai (final)
 Terry Hee Yong Kai / Tan Wei Han (semifinals)
 Evgenij Dremin / Evgenia Dimova (first round)
 Yuta Watanabe / Arisa Higashino (second round)
 Wang Yilu / Du Yue (withdrew)
 Lee Jhe-huei / Wu Ti-jung (first round)
 He Jiting / Xu Ya (quarterfinals)

Finals

Top half

Section 1

Section 2

Bottom half

Section 3

Section 4

References

External links
  ::: 대한배드민턴협회 ::: at www.koreabadminton.org
 Tournament link

Korea Masters
Korea
Korea Masters Prix Gold
Korea Masters Prix Gold
Korea Masters Grand Prix Gold
December 2016 sports events in South Korea